Cristo in India is a 1965 Italian film directed by Rinaldo Dal Fabbro.

Cast

External links
 

1965 films
Italian documentary films
1960s Italian-language films
1960s Italian films